David Lee is a New Zealand visual effects supervisor. He won an Academy Award in the category Best Visual Effects for the film Tenet.

Selected filmography 
 Tenet (2020; co-won with Andrew Jackson, Andrew Lockley and Scott R. Fisher)

References

External links 

Living people
Place of birth missing (living people)
Year of birth missing (living people)
Visual effects artists
Visual effects supervisors
Best Visual Effects Academy Award winners